Coleophora coriacea is a moth of the family Coleophoridae.

The larvae feed on Atraphaxis replicata, Atraphaxis virgata and Atraphaxis spinosa. They feed on the leaves of their host plant.

References

coriacea
Moths described in 1989